Chara Dimitriou (born 12 April 1990) is a Greek footballer who plays as a midfielder and has appeared for the Greece women's national team.

Career
Dimitriou has been capped for the Greece national team, appearing for the team during the 2019 FIFA Women's World Cup qualifying cycle.

References

External links
 
 
 

1990 births
Living people
Greek women's footballers
Greece women's international footballers
Panathinaikos Women's football players
Women's association football midfielders
Footballers from Thessaloniki
21st-century Greek women